Helvetica is a 2007 American independent feature-length documentary film about typography and graphic design, centered on the Helvetica typeface. Directed by Gary Hustwit, it was released in 2007 to coincide with the 50th anniversary of the typeface's introduction in 1957 and is considered the first of the Design Trilogy by the director.

Synopsis
Helvetica is a documentary that interviews many graphic designers involved in the history or modern usage of the Helvetica typeface. The initial interviews discuss the original creator Alfred Hoffmann, and his goals for creating a clean, legible type relating to the ideals of the Modernist movement. Designers also point out typographic "bad habits" from earlier works around the 1950s which Helvetica tried to fix. For example, illegible hand-made lettering and cramped cursive.

Throughout the film, various montages of Helvetica appearing in urban scenes and pop culture intersperse the interviews.

Later, other interviewers point out criticisms of Helvetica. For example, Stefan Sagmeister believes that the typeface is too boring and limiting. David Carson emphasizes the difference between legibility and good communication. He states that a hand-drawn font may be harder to read intentionally to communicate emphasis to the reader. Other designers dislike Helvetica on the grounds of ideology. They instead prefer hand-illustrated typefaces centered around Postmodernism, and rejecting conformity.

Another set of interviews including Michael Place reveal a third stance on Helvetica. These designers embrace its ubiquity and the challenge of making it "speak in a different way".

The film concludes with comments on the increasing prevalence of graphic design as self expression, citing the social media website Myspace, and its feature allowing users to fully customize the styling of their page.

Interviewees
 Manfred Schulz
 Massimo Vignelli
 Rick Poynor
 Wim Crouwel
 Matthew Carter
 Alfred Hoffmann, Eduard Hoffmann's son
 Mike Parker Linotype's typographic development director.
 Otmar Hoefer
 Bruno Steinert
 Hermann Zapf
 Michael Bierut
 Leslie Savan
 Tobias Frere-Jones
 Jonathan Hoefler
 Erik Spiekermann
 Neville Brody
 Lars Müller
 Paula Scher
 Stefan Sagmeister
 David Carson
 Experimental Jetset
 Michael C. Place
 Norm

Production
Hustwit on his inspiration for the film:  "When I started this project, I couldn't believe that a film like this didn't exist already, because these people are gods and goddesses. What they do is more than just logos and corporate branding - they design the type that we read every day in newspapers and magazines, onscreen and on television. Fonts don't just appear out of Microsoft Word: there are human beings and huge stories behind them."

Release
Helvetica premiered at the South by Southwest Film Festival in March 2007. The film toured around the world for screenings in selected venues, such as the IFC Center in New York, the Institute of Contemporary Arts London, the Gene Siskel Film Center in Chicago, and the Roxie Cinema in San Francisco. Helvetica was nominated for the 2008 Independent Spirit's Truer than Fiction Award.

Bands and musicians that contributed to the documentary's soundtrack include Four Tet, The Album Leaf, Kim Hiorthøy, Caribou, Battles, Sam Prekop of The Sea and Cake, and El Ten Eleven.

An edited version of the film was broadcast in the UK on BBC One in November 2007, as part of Alan Yentob's Imagine series. It aired in January 2009 as part of the Independent Lens series on PBS in the United States.

Critical reception
The New York Sun editor Steve Dollar claimed the movie was "more compelling than might be imagined."

Awards and nominations
In 2008, the documentary was nominated for "Truer Than Fiction Award" during the Independent Spirit Awards.

Home media
The film was released on DVD in November 2007 by Plexifilm.

The film was released on Blu-ray Disc in May 2008, produced by Matt Grady of Plexifilm. The limited (1,500 copies) edition includes Gary Hustwit's autograph. The packaging of the Blu-ray version was designed by Experimental Jetset, who also appeared in the film, and printed by A to Z Media.

See also

Objectified, a documentary film about industrial design, also by Gary Hustwit.
Typeface (film)

References

External links

Motion Graphics by Trollback + Company
Helvetica DVD review

2007 films
2007 documentary films
American documentary films
British documentary films
American independent films
Typography
Documentary films about the visual arts
History of printing
British independent films
Films directed by Gary Hustwit
2000s English-language films
2000s American films
2000s British films
2007 independent films